Rhizophagus parallelocollis, the graveyard beetle, is a species of root-eating beetle in the family Monotomidae. It is found in North America and Europe.

References

Further reading

External links

 

Monotomidae
Articles created by Qbugbot
Beetles described in 1827